The 2005–06 Toto Cup Al was the 22nd season of the third most important football tournament in Israel since its introduction and the second edition to be played with clubs of the Israeli Permier League only.

The competition was held in two stages. First, the 12 Premier League teams were divided into two groups. The group winners and runners-up advanced to the semi-finals, which, as was the final, were held as one-legged matches.

The competition was won by Maccabi Haifa who had beaten F.C. Ashdod 3–0 in the final.

Group stage

Group A

Group B

Elimination rounds

Semifinals

Final

See also
 2005–06 Toto Cup Leumit
 2005–06 Toto Cup Artzit

External links
 one.co.il 

Al
Toto Cup Al
Toto Cup Al